Charles Rendell Mabey (October 4, 1877 – April 26, 1959) was an American politician who served as the fifth Governor of Utah from 1921 to 1925. He is the last Utah governor to serve one term. He was a member of the Republican Party.

Life and career
Mabey was born in Bountiful in the Utah Territory. He served in the United States Army during the Spanish–American War.

From 1900–1903, Mabey served as a missionary for the Church of Jesus Christ of Latter-day Saints (LDS Church) in Germany.

Mabey was a banker by trade.  He was a member of the Utah House of Representatives from 1913 to 1917 and served again on active duty in the Utah Field Artillery during World War I. He also served for a time as mayor of Bountiful, Utah.

From 1925 to 1935, Mabey served as a member of the General Board of the Young Men's Mutual Improvement Association of the LDS Church.

Mabey fathered four children, all of them boys:  Rendell, Charles, Robert, and Edward.

Works

See also 
 List of members of the American Legion

References

External links
 
 

1877 births
1959 deaths
19th-century Mormon missionaries
20th-century Mormon missionaries
American bankers
American leaders of the Church of Jesus Christ of Latter-day Saints
American Mormon missionaries in Germany
Republican Party governors of Utah
Republican Party members of the Utah House of Representatives
People of the Spanish–American War
United States Army officers
Young Men (organization) people
Mayors of places in Utah
Latter Day Saints from Utah